The Jarao Formation is a geologic formation in Cuba. The dark-colored limestone intercalated with volcanic and tuffaceous formation preserves rudist fossils of Vaccinites inaequicostatus and dates back to the Santonian period.

See also 
 List of fossiliferous stratigraphic units in Cuba

References

Further reading 
 
 R. Rojas, M. Iturralde Vinent, and P. W. Skelton. 1995. Stratigraphy, composition and age of Cuban rudist-bearing deposits. Revista Mexicana de Ciencias Geológicas 12(2):272-291

Geologic formations of Cuba
Cretaceous Cuba
Santonian Stage
Limestone formations
Tuff formations
Shallow marine deposits
Formations